Niabella ginsengisoli is a Gram-negative, obligately aerobic and non-motile  bacterium from the genus of Niabella which has been isolated from a ginseng field .

References

External links
Type strain of Niabella ginsengisoli at BacDive -  the Bacterial Diversity Metadatabase

Chitinophagia
Bacteria described in 2009